The following lists the top 100 singles of 1992 in Australia from the Australian Recording Industry Association (ARIA) End of Year Singles Chart.

Peak chart positions are from the ARIA Charts, overall position on the End of Year Chart is calculated by ARIA based on the number of weeks and position that the records reach within the Top 50 singles for each week during 1992.

Notes

References

Australian record charts
1992 in Australian music
1992 record charts